You Might Be the Killer is a 2018 American supernatural slasher film directed by Brett Simmons and written by Covis Berzoyne, Thomas P. Vitale, and Simmons, based on an idea by Chuck Wendig and Sam Sykes. The film stars Fran Kranz and Alyson Hannigan, and features Brittany S. Hall, Patrick Reginald Walker, Keith David, and Bryan Price in supporting roles.

Plot
While in a panicked state at Camp Clear Vista, lead counselor (and camp owner) Sam calls his friend Chuck (short for "Charlotte"), a horror movie enthusiast working at a comic book store. Sam explains that a masked murderer is loose on the campgrounds and has killed "a lot" of counselors. Chuck asks Sam for more details. Sam begins recounting his first day at the camp with fellow counselors including Carol, Ted, Steve ‘The Kayak King,’ Drew, Alice and Heather, Sam's ex-girlfriend Imani, Freddie, Nancy, Brad, and Jamie.

Sam suffers a momentary blackout while on the phone with Chuck. Sam escapes the cabin where he is hiding when someone sets it on fire. Sam briefly encounters the masked killer before finding a new hiding spot. Chuck calls back to help Sam deduce the killer's identity. Sam recalls how he and several other counselors found themselves trapped at the camp after discovering several dead bodies. A flashback shows Sam stumbling upon Freddie and Nancy while patrolling the woods for the killer. For some reason Freddie and Nancy are unable to hear Sam. Sam begins suffering a blackout as he witnesses the killer slaughtering them.

Sam and Chuck eventually conclude that because he is covered in blood, holding the killer's signature blade, and possesses a mysterious wooden mask, Sam may actually be the killer and his blackouts prevented him from remembering. Sam tries to destroy the mask, but discovers it is unbreakable. He then attempts to burn the mask, only for his face to burn as well. Chuck theorizes that the mask may have imprinted on him. Fearful that the surviving counselors are going to kill him, Sam goes back into hiding.

Chuck asks Sam to remember how everything started. Sam flashes back to killing skinny-dippers at a pool, a couple in a kitchen, and then his friend, Steve "The Kayak King," while possessed by the mask. Sam recalls telling Camp Clear Vista's haunted history to other counselors around a campfire. Sam tells the tale of a woodcarver who crafted a mask from a tree where a dark spirit was trapped a century earlier by a Cajun medicine man. The mask compelled the carver to kill his family and others in the village until a young woman kills him to stop the killings. Now the cursed mask is rumored to be buried at the woodcarver's grave.

Despite Sam's warning that the story is true, the counselors go off to look for the mask. Drew manipulates Sam into inadvertently revealing where the woodcarver's grave is. Drew discovers the mask buried by the headstone. Sam convinces Drew to not wear the mask, so she puts it on Sam instead as a joke. Sam then becomes possessed by it, recovers the woodcarver's hidden weapon (a ceremonial-looking jagged blade, made from a gator jaw), and kills Drew.

Sam continues flashing back to the other murders he unknowingly committed while wearing the mask. Sam remembers choking out Imani before throwing her into a spike pit as his most recent kill. Sam's feelings for Imani allows him to take off the mask. With Chuck fully caught up, she advises Sam to be aware of Jamie because she appears to be the Final Girl.

Sam tries to fight it, but a supernatural compulsion causes Sam to don the mask again and kill Brad. Imani emerges from the spike pit, having faked her death, to regroup with Jamie. The two manage to knock the mask off Sam and lock him in a shed. Sam tries explaining that the mask made him kill. Sam also expresses that he believes that if both Imani and Jamie stay alive, all three of them could be safe since there won't be a face off with the Final Girl. Over the phone, Chuck explains the Final Girl concept to the two remaining women.

While Chuck warns them to keep Sam away from the mask, Sam is compelled to wear it once more. Sam breaks out of the shed, prompting Imani and Jamie to run. Thinking she will survive if she becomes the Final Girl, Imani tries to kill Jamie. However, Jamie kills Imani instead. Over the phone, Chuck tells Jamie that she now needs to kill Sam at the woodcarver's grave because it is the place of power.

Sam manages to tear off the mask and head to the gravesite himself—he has a plan. After telling his plan to Chuck, Sam convinces Jamie that they both can survive if they stop the curse by burying the mask. Jamie digs a hole at the burial site. However, Jamie becomes compelled to don the mask when she touches it. Jamie stabs Sam with the woodcarver's blade, and he falls over dead. With the mask removed, Jamie tells Chuck over the phone that the ordeal is over. She then walks off, taking the mask with her.

Two years later Chuck receives a call from a panicked Sam, having become undead.

Cast

 Fran Kranz as Sam Wescott
 Alyson Hannigan as Chuck
 Brittany S. Hall as Imani
 Jenna Harvey as Jamie
 Bryan Price as Steve "The Kayak King"
 Patrick Reginald Walker as Brad
 Jack Murillo as Freddie
 Catt Bellamy as Drew
 Savannah DesOrmeaux as Nancy
 Carol Jean Wells as Heather
 Peter Jaymes as Bob
 Olivia Brown as Carol
 Jesse Gallegos as Ted
 Clara Chong as Alice
 Isaiah LaBorde as the Wood Carver
 Keith David as Sheriff James (voice)

Co-writer and producer Thomas P. Vitale appears as a Rings of Saturn customer.

Production
The concept for the film originated in July 2017 between the banter of two writers, Sam Sykes and Chuck Wendig, on Twitter, where they had been discussing the tropes of a typical slasher film. The idea was then developed into a film to be directed by Brett Simmons, with Sykes and Wendig involved as producers.

Filming was underway in Louisiana by May 2018.

Release and reception
The film debuted at the 2018 Fantastic Fest, and screened at the Toronto After Dark Film Festival as well as about 15 other festivals in the U.S. and around the world. On December 6, 2018 it was released on Shudder before being released on DVD and Blu-ray on February 5, 2019.

References

External links

2018 horror films
Slasher comedy films
American comedy horror films
2010s slasher films
American slasher films
Films shot in Louisiana
Parodies of horror
Supernatural slasher films
2010s English-language films
2010s American films